Kenneth Culver Johnson (born October 26, 1942) is an American screenwriter, producer and director. He is known as the creator of the V science fiction franchise as well as  The Bionic Woman (1976–78), The Incredible Hulk series (1977–82), and the TV adaptation (1989) of Alien Nation. His creative efforts are almost entirely concentrated in the area of television science fiction.

Early life
A native of Pine Bluff, Arkansas, Johnson is a graduate of the Carnegie Institute of Technology.

Career

1970s
His early TV work includes The Six Million Dollar Man, The Bionic Woman and The Incredible Hulk. Johnson created the character of Jaime Sommers and The Bionic Woman, an American television series starring Lindsay Wagner that aired for three seasons between 1976 and 1978 as a spin-off from The Six Million Dollar Man.

1980s
In 1983, he wrote and directed the original miniseries V, about an invasion of Earth by reptilian aliens, originally inspired by Sinclair Lewis' anti-fascist novel It Can't Happen Here (1935). The miniseries aired on NBC, and a year later was followed by a sequel, V: The Final Battle, which Johnson briefly worked on before leaving the project due to disagreements with the network. Johnson was subsequently credited as a co-writer of the sequel miniseries under the pseudonym Lillian Weezer, and was not involved at all in the weekly V television series that followed.

He directed Short Circuit 2 in 1988.

In 1989, he produced the television series Alien Nation based on the 1988 film of the same name.

1990s
He wrote and directed 1994 Baker Street: Sherlock Holmes Returns in 1993, an American television movie about the fictional detective Sherlock Holmes, that stars Anthony Higgins as Holmes.

He wrote and directed five TV movies that served as spin-offs to his Alien Nation series. They were: Alien Nation: Dark Horizon (1994), Alien Nation: Body and Soul (1995), Alien Nation: Millennium (1996), Alien Nation: The Enemy Within (1996), and Alien Nation: The Udara Legacy (1997).

In 1997, he wrote and directed the movie Steel, based on the DC comic book character Steel. It featured basketball player Shaquille O'Neal as John Henry Irons, the character's alter-ego. The film was a financial and critical failure.

He directed the 1999 Disney Channel Original Movie Zenon: Girl of the 21st Century, starring Kirsten Storms as the eponymous heroine. The film was based on the book Zenon: Girl of the 21st Century written by Marilyn Sadler and Roger Bollen.

In 1999 he also directed Don't Look Under the Bed, a Disney Channel Original Movie.

2000s
In 2006, Johnson announced his completion of a four-hour script for a new V mini series called V: The Second Generation. The storyline takes place 20 years after the original 1983 mini-series, ignoring the second mini-series (V: The Final Battle) and subsequent weekly television series. However, NBC told Johnson that they were more interested in a remake of the original V mini-series instead, which, if successful, might lead to his proposed sequel.

Since then, Johnson adapted his screenplay for V: The Second Generation into a novel. It was published by Tor Books and released on February 5, 2008. However, since his discussions with NBC, Warner Bros (who hold the television rights to the V franchise) have opted to produce a remake of V (written by Scott Peters) for the ABC Network, thus ending any prospect of Johnson's sequel being produced for television.

In April 2008, Johnson stated his intention to remake the original V mini-series and his new sequel V: The Second Generation into feature films. Johnson claimed to have been in discussions with producers interested in the project. Since this statement, Johnson's potential film production has not been developed further, although talks with potential backers are still ongoing. The Warner Bros. television remake for ABC premiered on November 3, 2009. It was canceled in 2011, after two seasons, due to low ratings.

2010s
In 2017, Johnson published the novel The Man of Legends.

Personal life
Johnson married Bonnie Hollaway on February 2, 1963; the couple had three children and divorced in 1975. On June 19, 1977 (the day after completing filming of the pilot movie of The Incredible Hulk series), he married Susan Appling; they have one child.

Filmography

References

External links

Kenneth Johnson's page at Tor Books
Kenneth Johnson 2009 interview

1942 births
American film producers
American male novelists
American science fiction writers
American male screenwriters
American television directors
American television producers
American television writers
Carnegie Mellon University alumni
Living people
People from Pine Bluff, Arkansas
American male television writers
20th-century American novelists
20th-century American male writers
21st-century American novelists
21st-century American male writers
Film directors from Arkansas
Screenwriters from Arkansas